Brushy Fork is a  long 2nd order tributary to Pauls Creek in Surry County, North Carolina.

Course 
Brushy Fork rises at Cana, Virginia, in Carroll County and then flows generally south into Surry County, North Carolina to join Pauls Creek about 1.5 milea northwest of Toast, North Carolina.

Watershed 
Brushy Fork drains  of area, receives about 48.3 in/year of precipitation, has a wetness index of 339.13, and is about 52% forested.

See also 
 List of Rivers of North Carolina
 List of Rivers of Virginia

References 

Rivers of Surry County, North Carolina
Rivers of Carroll County, Virginia
Rivers of North Carolina
Rivers of Virginia